Atlantik may refer to:

Atlantik (band), a soca-music band based in Trinidad and Tobago
Hamburg Atlantic Line (Hamburg Atlantik Linie), a shipping company later known as Deutsche Atlantik Linie
Atlantik (film), a 1929 British-made German language drama film

See also

Atlantic (disambiguation)
 Atlantique (disambiguation)